SSSS may refer to:

Arts, entertainment, and media
 Ssss, music album by duo VCMG, Vince Clarke and Martin Gore, released in 2012
 Superhuman Samurai Syber-Squad, US TV series
 SSSS.Gridman, anime series
 Stand Still, Stay Silent, webcomic
 She Said She Said, a song by The Beatles

Biology and healthcare
  Staphylococcal scalded skin syndrome, a skin reaction

Organizations
 Society for the Scientific Study of Sexuality

Other uses
 Only Unity Saves the Serbs, a Serbian slogan initialized as СССС in Cyrillic, or SSSS in Latin.
 Secondary Security Screening Selection in US airports

See also

4S (disambiguation)
S4 (disambiguation)
S (disambiguation)